Dušanovac may refer to:

 Dušanovac, Belgrade, an urban neighbourhood of Belgrade, Serbia
 Dušanovac, Negotin, a municipality of Negotin, Serbia
 , a former village in modern Serbia which merged with Zvarnjak and formed Banatski Dvor
 , a village in Kosovo formerly known as Dušanovac in Serbian